Dichromism may refer to:
 Dichromacy, colour blindness
 Dichromatism, the phenomenon where the hue of the colour is dependent on the thickness of the medium
 Dichroism, a phenomenon where the material is splitting two or more beams of different colours (wavelengths)
 Sexual dimorphism, or sexual dichromism